This is a list of launches conducted by the Indian Space Research Organisation (ISRO) using Geosynchronous Satellite Launch Vehicle (GSLV) rockets. This list does not include LVM 3 (also known as GSLV Mk III) launches, which can be found here.

Notable missions

GSLV MK. I flight D1 

This was the first developmental flight of the GSLV  Mk.I featuring Russian cryogenic engine KVD-1. It was used to place an experimental satellite GSAT-1 into the orbit. However, due to sub-optimal performance and lack of fuel the vehicle did not achieve the intended orbit and the satellite had to maneuver itself using onboard fuel to correct the shortfall. ISRO claims the launch to be successful. In a 2014 interview, ISRO Chairman K. Radhakrishnan attributed the failure to incorrect mixture ratio used in the cryogenic upper stage.

GSLV MK. II flight D5 

This was the second test flight with indigenous cryogenic stage CE-7.5 and the first successful launch with the CE-7.5. The flight lifted and successfully placed the  GSAT-14 into the orbit. This flight became the harbinger of successful launch with the indigenous cryogenic stage.

GSLV MK. II flight F09 

This was the fourth consecutive successful flight of GSLV Mk. II with indigenous cryogenic engine. The flight placed the regional satellite South Asia Satellite was previously named as South Asian Association for Regional Cooperation (SAARC) Satellite. The satellite was a gift from India to its neighbors to bolsters Prime Minister Narendra Modi's neighborhood first policy Afghanistan, Bangladesh, Bhutan, Maldives, Nepal and Sri Lanka are the users of the multi-dimensional facilities provided by the satellite.

Launch statistics

GSLV Mk. I

GSLV Mk. II

Mission outcome - GSLV Mk. I

Mission outcome - GSLV Mk. II

Launch history 
, rockets from the GSLV family have made 14 launches, resulting in 8 successes, four failures, and two partial failures. All launches have occurred from the Satish Dhawan Space Centre, known before 2002 as the Sriharikota Range (SHAR).

Future launches

Gallery

See also 
 GSLV
 PSLV
 List of PSLV launches
 Comparison of orbital launchers families
 Comparison of orbital launch systems
 ISRO

References 

 
ISRO space launch vehicles
Satish Dhawan Space Centre
GSLV
Vehicles introduced in 2001
Expendable space launch systems